Teucrium is a cosmopolitan genus of flowering plants in the family Lamiaceae, commonly known as germanders. Plants in this genus are perennial herbs or shrubs, with branches that are more or less square in cross-section, leaves arranged in opposite pairs, and flowers arranged in thyrses, the corolla with mostly white to cream-coloured, lobed petals.

Description
Plants in the genus Teucrium are perennial herbs or shrubs with four-cornered stems, often with simple hairs and sessile glands. The leaves are arranged in opposite pairs, simple or with three leaflets sometimes with lobed or serrated edges. The flowers are arranged in a thyrse, sometimes in a cyme in leaf axils. The flowers have five more or less similar sepals fused at the base, and the corolla is white or cream-coloured with five lobes forming two lips. The upper lip is usually much reduced in size and the lower lip has three lobes, the central lobe usually larger than the side lobes. There are four stamens attached near the base of the petals and the fruit is a schizocarp with four segments.

Taxonomy
The genus Teucrium was first formally described in 1753 by Carl Linnaeus in Species Plantarum. The name Teucrium was used by Pedanius Dioscorides for several species in this genus, and is believed to refer to King Teucer of Troy who used the plant in his medicine.

Species
(See List of Teucrium species)

Teucrium is a cosmopolitan genus with about 300 species, the distribution centred on the Mediterranean. There are about thirteen species endemic to Australia.

Fossil record
†Teucrium  tatjanae  seed fossils are known from the Oligocene, Miocene and Pliocene of  western Siberia, Miocene and Pliocene of central and southern Russia and Miocene of Lusatia. The fossil seeds are similar to seeds of the extant Teucrium orientale.
†Teucrium pripiatense seed fossils  have been described from the Pliocene Borsoni  Formation in the Rhön Mountains of central Germany.

References

External links

 USDA PLANTS Profile

Lamiaceae genera
Taxa named by Carl Linnaeus